Gavan Michael O'Connor (born 2 December 1947) is an Australian politician who was an Australian Labor Party (ALP) member of the Australian House of Representatives from March 1993 to November 2007, representing the Division of Corio, Victoria.

Career

Education
He was born in Colac, Victoria, and was educated at St Patrick's College, Ballarat, Monash University and the University of New England. He was a farmer, high school teacher, and member of the Colac City Council before entering Parliament.

Politics
He contested the 1984 Corangamite by-election but was unsuccessful as it was a safe Liberal seat.  He won the seat of Corio at the 1993 federal election.

He became Parliamentary Secretary to the Leader of the Opposition (Kim Beazley) from 1996 to 1998 and Member of the Opposition Shadow Ministry from October 1998. He was Shadow Minister for Agriculture and Fisheries from December 2003 until 2007 when he was dropped in a cabinet reshuffle by incoming leader Kevin Rudd.

O'Connor lost his endorsement as the ALP candidate for Corio to Richard Marles in March 2007. On 18 October the same year, he announced he would run as an independent at the 2007 election, and achieved 12.7 percent of the vote, but lost to Marles.

References

1947 births
Living people
Australian Labor Party members of the Parliament of Australia
Independent members of the Parliament of Australia
Members of the Australian House of Representatives
Members of the Australian House of Representatives for Corio
Monash University alumni
University of New England (Australia) alumni
Australian farmers
Australian schoolteachers
People educated at St Patrick's College, Ballarat
People from Colac, Victoria
21st-century Australian politicians
20th-century Australian politicians